Firangiz Teymurova (born 14 August 1999) is an Azerbaijani footballer who plays as a midfielder for Ugur and the Azerbaijan women's national team.

Club career
Teymurova has played for Torpedo Izhevsk in Russia and for Ugur in Azerbaijan.

International career
Teymurova capped for Azerbaijan at senior level during the UEFA Women's Euro 2022 qualifying.

See also
List of Azerbaijan women's international footballers

References

1999 births
Living people
Azerbaijani women's footballers
Women's association football midfielders
Russian Women's Football Championship players
Azerbaijan women's international footballers
Azerbaijani expatriate footballers
Azerbaijani expatriate sportspeople in Russia
Expatriate women's footballers in Russia